Steinberg is a municipality in the Vogtlandkreis district, in Saxony, Germany. It was established in 1994 by the merger of the three villages Rothenkirchen, Wernesgrün and Wildenau and named after the nearby Steinberg (661m/2168 ft), part of the Ore Mountains.

Wernesgrün is home of the Wernesgrüner brewery.

References 

Municipalities in Saxony
Vogtlandkreis